One Through Zero (The Ten Numbers) is a monumental series of sculptures by the American artist Robert Indiana. The work depicts the numerical digits 1, 2, 3, 4, 5, 6, 7, 8, and 9 and 0. The work was created between 1980 and 2001. The numbers are made from polychrome aluminium with each measuring 72 x 72 x 36 in. (182.9 x 182.9 x 91.4 cm.).

The use of numbers became prominent in Indiana's artworks from the end of the 1950s and became an established part of his style in the 1960s. The design of the numbers was inspired by a printer's calendar Indiana found in his loft in Coenties Slip. The piece was first created for a property developer in Indianapolis; the work was then donated to the Indianapolis Museum of Art. The work was subsequently created for a siting in Park Avenue in New York City in 2003 as part of the 'Art on the Park' series, outside Beverly Hills City Hall in 2005, and on Lime Street, London from 2013 as part of the City of London's 'Sculpture in the City' series. An edition of One Through Zero (The Ten Numbers) made from COR-TEN steel was displayed in London's Regent's Park in 2019.

Indiana had previously created a work with the poet Robert Creeley of a book of poems with poems about each number facing Indiana's screen printed coloured numbers.

Interpretation and meaning
The digits can be arranged in any order to generate new meanings and interpretations.

Indiana ascribed particular meanings to the colours that he chose for each digit.

Indiana's website ascribes the meanings as:

One: Red and blue, associated with birth
Two: Green and blue, signifying infancy
Three: Orange and blue representing youth
Four: Yellow and red, connected to adolescence
Five: White and blue signifying the 'pre-prime' of life
Six: Green and red signifying the prime of life
Seven: Blue and orange suggesting the 'early autumn' of life
Eight: Purple and red signalling autumn
Nine: Black and yellow conveying a sense of warning
Ten: The use of grey signals the end of the biological life cycle

References

1980 sculptures
Sculptures by American artists
Numbers